Sandy Lake (Nova Scotia) could refer to one of the following lakes:

Annapolis County 

 Sandy Lake located at

Guysborough County 
 Sandy Lake located at 
 Sandy Lake located at 
 Sandy Lake located at

Hants County 

 Sandy Lake located at

Halifax Regional Municipality 

 Sandy Lake located on the Chebucto Peninsula at 
 Sandy Lake located in Beaverbank at 
 Sandy Lake located near Devon at 
 Sandy Lake located near Glen Moir at 
 Sandy Lake located at

References
Geographical Names Board of Canada
Explore HRM
Nova Scotia Placenames

Lakes of Nova Scotia